Battle of Constantinople may refer to one of the following battles fought at or near Constantinople:

 Battle of Constantinople (378), Gothic attack on the city
 Battle of Constantinople (922), between the Byzantines and the Bulgarians
 Battle of Constantinople (1147), between the Byzantines and the Second Crusade
 Battle of Constantinople (1241), naval clash between the Nicaeans and the Venetians

See also
 Siege of Constantinople